Aubrey Murphy is an Irish violinist who is Concertmaster of the Cleveland Opera Theater and Opera Project Columbus. Murphy was previously Concertmaster of the Opera Australia (OA) orchestra in Sydney, Australia and was Principal Violinist for the Royal Opera House Orchestra, London, UK.

Background
Murphy was born in Dublin, Ireland and began playing piano and violin at the age of five. At age ten, he was the first Irish student ever to enter the Yehudi Menuhin School, where he studied with Felix Andrievsky, Peter Norris and Hans Keller. In 1983 he began his studies at Indiana University, Bloomington, under Franco Gulli, Henryk Kowalski, Josef Gingold and Rostislav Dubinsky.

Career
Murphy has been guest leader with Scottish Chamber Orchestra and Ulster Orchestra. He then spent eight years with the Orchestra of the Royal Opera House, Covent Garden as Principal Violinist and regular Guest Concertmaster, working with conductors such as Georg Solti, Bernard Haitink, Sir Charles Mackerras and Colin Davis. In 2002, Murphy was appointed as Concertmaster for Opera Australia at the Sydney Opera House under the baton of Simone Young. In 1993, he was a founding member of the 'Soloists of the Royal Opera House', and in 2002 he founded the 'Utzon Ensemble' that played at the inaugural concert in the newly refurbished Utzon Room of the Sydney Opera House in addition to a series of chamber music concerts in Sydney from 2002–2008.
In July 2012, Murphy resigned his post as Concertmaster of the Australian Opera and Ballet Orchestra.

Recognition
 Artists Diploma and Performers Certificate (Bloomington)
 Centenary Medal for Services to Music in Australia.

Discography
 Numerous recordings with Orchestra of the Royal Opera, Covent Garden and various artists
 The Love for Three Oranges (Prokoviev) and Rusalka (Dvorak) with Opera Australia (conducted by Richard Hickox on the Chandos label, and with The Australian Ballet under the baton of Nicolette Fraillon

Instrument
Murphy owns and plays an 1853 Giuseppe Rocca violin, acquired through Bein and Fushi in 2003.

References 
 Aubrey Murphy biography at Opera Australia
  at cleveland.com

Irish violinists
Irish male violinists
Male classical violinists
Living people
Concertmasters
Year of birth missing (living people)
Indiana University alumni
Musicians from Dublin (city)
21st-century classical violinists
21st-century male musicians